The 2017 Ukrainian Figure Skating Championships were held from 20 to 23 December 2016 in Kyiv. Medals were awarded in the disciplines of men's singles, ladies' singles, pair skating, and ice dancing. The results were among the criteria used to select Ukrainian teams to the 2017 World Championships, 2017 European Championships, and 2017 Winter Universiade.

Results

Men

Ladies

Pairs

Ice dancing

International team selections

European Championships

Winter Universiade

External links
 2016–17 Ukrainian Championships at the Ukrainian Figure Skating Federation
 http://www.ufsf.com.ua/kalendar-zmahan.html Ukrainian domestic competitions in 2016–17 season

Ukrainian Figure Skating Championships
Ukrainian Championships
Ukrainian Championships
Figure Skating Championships
Figure Skating Championships
December 2016 events in Ukraine
Sports competitions in Kyiv
2010s in Kyiv